CS Măgura Cisnădie is a professional women's handball club in Cisnădie, Sibiu County, Romania, that competes in the Liga Naţională.

Kits

Honours

Domestic competitions
Liga Națională (National League of Romania) 
 Third place: 2017–18

Team

Current squad

Goalkeepers
  Ana Măzăreanu
  Mirela Pașca
  Andreea Ilie 
Wingers
LW
  Dana Abed Kader
  Abigail Vălean 
RW
  Marilena Burghel-Neagu
  Cristina Mitrache

Line players
  Timea Tătar
  Cynthia Tomescu
  Mouna Jlezi

Back players
LB
  Yuliya Garyaeva
  Aslı İskit
  Giulia Guarieiro
CB
  Elena Dache
  Valentina Panici
RB
  Elena Gjeorgjievska

Transfers
Transfers for the 2023-24 season

Joining
  Marta Batinović (GK) (from  SCM Gloria Buzău)
  Marina Rajčić (GK) (from  Siófok KC)
  Ilda Kepić (LB) (from  ŽRK Budućnost Podgorica)
  Emilia Galińska (LB) (from  Metraco Zagłębie Lubin)
  Natallia Vasileuskaya (RB) (from  SCM Gloria Buzău)

Leaving
  Ana Măzăreanu (GK) (to  SCM Gloria Buzău)
  Aslı İskit (LB) (to  Kastamonu Bld. GSK)

Notable former players
  Ada Moldovan
  Raluca Băcăoanu
  Ana Maria Tănasie
  Adriana Crăciun
  Oana Apetrei
  Nicoleta Tudor
  Alina Horjea
  Cătălina Cioaric
  Mihaela Popescu
  Deonise Fachinello
  Larissa Araújo 
  Mariana Costa
  Gabriela Moreschi
  Jaqueline Anastácio
  Jasna Boljević
  Ivana Božović
  Dijana Ujkić
  Nataša Krnić

External links

Romanian handball clubs
Liga Națională (women's handball) clubs
Handball clubs established in 2014
2014 establishments in Romania
Sport in Sibiu County